Sum-ag is a former town and constituent barangay of Bacolod. Located on the southernmost section of the city, it is considered the southern gateway of Bacolod, coming from different cities and towns of the south (e.g. Kabankalan City and Hinoba-an) and the port of Pulupandan.

History
Instituted as a pueblo in 1780 with Don Andres Claridad as the first presidente municipal. It was dissolved, along with the town of Granada, and incorporated to Bacolod in 1902 upon the dissolution of the Republic of Negros and the reorganization initiated by the American Insular Government of the Philippine Islands.

Present area
Currently, the land area of modern Sum-ag is significantly smaller than the original town. Tangub, Cabug and Punta Taytay were constituent territories carved out from Sum-ag, yet Sum-ag remains the main commercial, religious and educational hub in southern Bacolod. Being the southernmost tip of the city, it was one of the areas considered for the South Bacolod Transport Terminal.

Educational
Sum-ag Elementary School serves the primary needs of the community, along with nearby Sum-ag National High School. The Benedictine Sisters of St. Scholastica runs Holy Family Vocational School in Sum-ag as a charity, co-educational institution. VMA Global College and Bacolod City College Sum-ag Campus serves the tertiary educational needs of the residents.

Tourism
Its proximity to the seashore made Sum-ag a weekend destination for Bacolod residents, along with nearby Punta-Taytay. However, Sum-ag River, which bisects the barangay is currently being developed as a cruising destination and natural preservation. The river is home to a small fishing wharf and a water transport facility for Coca-Cola Bottlers Philippines.

Demographics
Sum-ag residents are predominantly Roman Catholic and adherents are currently served by the San Juan de Nepomuceno Parish Church. However, there is a strong Protestant presence in the area, most notably Sum-ag Evangelical Church. It is home to the provincial offices of the Philippine Convention of Baptist Churches and the Adventist Church in the Philippines.

Iglesia ni Cristo and Church of Jesus Christ of Latter-day Saints (commonly known as the Mormons) have a small congregation in Sum-ag.

References

Bacolod
Metro Bacolod
Barangays of Negros Occidental
Former municipalities of the Philippines
Populated places established in 1780
1780 establishments in the Philippines